is a former Japanese football player and manager. He played for Japan national team.

Club career
Sudo was born in Mikasa on April 2, 1956. After graduating from Chuo University, he joined Hitachi in 1979. The club won the 2nd place in 1980 JSL Cup and 1982 Japan Soccer League. He retired in 1987. He played 117 games in the league.

National team career
On August 23, 1979, Sudo debuted for Japan national team against North Korea. In 1980, he played at 1980 Summer Olympics qualification and 1982 World Cup qualification. He played 13 games for Japan until 1981.

Coaching career
After retirement, Sudo mainly coached his alma mater Chuo University and some youth teams. In 2018, he signed with Japan Football League club Verspah Oita and became a manager.

Club statistics

National team statistics

References

External links
 
 Japan National Football Team Database

1956 births
Living people
Chuo University alumni
Association football people from Hokkaido
Japanese footballers
Japan international footballers
Japan Soccer League players
Kashiwa Reysol players
Japanese football managers
Association football defenders
People from Mikasa, Hokkaido